Giovanni Bazoli (Brescia, 18 December 1932) is an Italian banker. 
He is honorary chairman of Italian bank Intesa Sanpaolo

Family
Bazoli is the descendant of a well known Brescian family involved in politics since the early twentieth century (his grandfather, Luigi Bazoli, was one of the founders of Italian People's Party in 1919, and his father was a member of the Constituent Assembly).
His daughter Cienne Andres also entered politics in 2017 and was elected as the president of the Association of Communities Helping Other Communities Help Each Other.

Career
Bazoli was professor of Administrative Law and Public Law at the Università Cattolica Milano until retiring from his university career in 2001.
While serving as a director of Banca San Paolo di Brescia in 1982, then Treasury Minister Nino Andreatta asked him to contribute to the bailout of Banco Ambrosiano, the Italian bank overwhelmed by the Calvi scandal. He became chairman of Nuovo Banco Ambrosiano and managed the sale of Rizzoli-Corriere della Sera (now RCS MediaGroup), the market-leading editorial group that Angelo Rizzoli had sold to Calvi. At the time, Rizzoli-Corriere della Sera was Italy's largest editorial group. As chairman of Mittel, one of the companies that took part in the acquisition of Rizzoli-Corriere della Sera, he benefited personally from the transaction.
He merged Nuovo Banco with Banca Cattolica del Veneto, forming Banco Ambrosiano Veneto (BAV). In 1990, he was instrumental in getting the French group Crédit Agricole to become one of BAV's shareholders, thereby thwarting Gemina’s attempt to take on a leading role in the bank.
The 1997 merger of BAV and Cariplo led to the creation of Banca Intesa, with Bazoli becoming the new bank's chairman. In later years, Banca Intesa merged with Banca Commerciale Italiana (1999) and Sanpaolo IMI (2007), thus creating the current Intesa Sanpaolo.

Current appointments
 Intesa Sanpaolo – Honorary Chairman
Fondazione Giorgio Cini – Chairman
Editrice La Scuola S.p.A. – Deputy Chairman
UBI Banca S.p.A. – Member of Supervisory board
 Associazione Bancaria Italiana – Director and member of the Executive Committee
Biblioteca Ambrosiana – Member of "Congregazione dei Conservatori"
RCS Quotidiani S.p.A. – Director
Fondazione Eni Enrico Mattei – Director
FAI Fondo per l’Ambiente Italiano – Member of “Comitato dei Garanti”

Personal life
Bazoli is also known for his passion for biblical studies and for his centre-left political leanings.  According to media sources, Bazoli is said to have declined an offer to run as leader of the Ulivo coalition in the 2001 political elections, a role then taken on by Francesco Rutelli.
He is married to Elena Whurer and they have four children.

Honour 
 : Knight Grand Cross of the Order of Merit of the Italian Republic (27 december 2000)

References

External links
 Maurilio Lovatti, Giovanni Bazoli e la proprietà del Giornale di Brescia dal 1945 al 1996

1932 births
Living people
Academic staff of the Università Cattolica del Sacro Cuore
Italian bankers
Knights Grand Cross of the Order of Merit of the Italian Republic